A Rose Beyond the Thames is a partly fictional collection of memoirs written by the English author Michael de Larrabeiti and published in the United Kingdom in 1978 by The Bodley Head.

Novels by Michael de Larrabeiti
1978 British novels
British autobiographical novels
The Bodley Head books